Steven Seth Wilson is an American science fiction screenwriter, and is probably best known for writing (and occasionally directing), with writing partner Brent Maddock, the Tremors film and television series. Wilson is a founding partner of Stampede Entertainment.

Filmography

Feature films

Short films

TV series

Publications
 Tucker's Monster (2010)

References

External links

S.S. Wilson biography at Stampede Entertainment

American male screenwriters
American horror writers
20th-century American male writers
American film directors
Place of birth missing (living people)
Year of birth missing (living people)
American film producers
Living people
English-language film directors